"Enjoy Yourself (It's Later Than You Think)" is a popular song published in 1949, with music written by Carl Sigman and lyrics by Herb Magidson.

Cover versions
A popular version of the song, recorded by Guy Lombardo and His Royal Canadians, was made on 27 November (some sources give 28 November), 1949. The recording was released by Decca Records as catalog number 24825. The record first reached the Billboard record chart in the US on 13 January 1950, and lasted 19 weeks on the chart, peaking at number 10.

Bing Crosby
Doris Day
Tommy Dorsey
Jolie Holland
Jools Holland & His Rhythm & Blues Orchestra
Louis Prima
Prince Buster
The Specials
Wingless Angels 
The Supremes
Todd Snider

In popular culture
 The 2003 recording by Jools Holland and Prince Buster was used by Simon Mayo as the opening theme to his Drivetime show on BBC Radio 2. The show also occasionally used the Guy Lombardo recording as an opening theme to the second hour.
 On October 31, 2015, the Trey Anastasio Band performed the song at Brooklyn Bowl Las Vegas.
 For 27 years, a cover version of this song's chorus with Cantonese lyrics was used as the theme song for Enjoy Yourself Tonight, a Hong Kong variety show that was one of the longest running live shows in television history worldwide.
 The Louis Prima version of the song was used in the series finale of the show House. Amber Volakis (Anne Dudek) also sings a version of this song in the season 5 episode titled "Under My Skin."
 The soundtrack for Woody Allen's movie Everyone Says I Love You, 1996
 The Doris Day version of the song was used in a “Honda Accord” commercial and the ninth episode of the third season of The Man in the High Castle.
 It was the closing song for Jools Holland’s Jools' Annual Hootenanny from 2010-19, and again in 2022.
 It was mentioned in the 2022 movie The Adam Project
 Jeff the robot plays The Specials cover version on a CD while driving the RV in Finch (film).

References

Songs with lyrics by Herb Magidson
1949 songs
Songs written by Carl Sigman
The Specials songs
1949 singles
Bing Crosby songs
Doris Day songs
Tommy Dorsey songs
The Supremes songs
Guy Lombardo songs